Loyolaia is a genus of thrips in the family Phlaeothripidae.

Species
 Loyolaia indica
 Loyolaia orientalis
 Loyolaia wuyiensis

References

Phlaeothripidae
Thrips
Thrips genera